Peter Quesnel (or Quesuel) (d. 1299?) was an English Franciscan friar who became the warden of the Franciscan house at Norwich, England. Quesnel held a high reputation as a "theologian and doctor of the canon law", and was the author of Directorium Juris in Foro Conscientiæ et Juridiciali.

Works
Quesnel's work is divided into four books: 
De summa Trinitate et fide Catholica, et de septem Sacramentis; 
De iisdem Sacramentis ministrandis et accipiendis; 
De Criminibus quæ a Sacramentis impediunt et de pœnis iisdem injungendis; 
De iis quæ ad jus spectant ordinate dirigendis.
(Little, Greyfriars at Oxford, p. 224 n. 1, Oxf. Hist. Soc.).

References

Attribution

English Franciscans
English Christian theologians
Clergy from Norwich
1299 deaths
Year of birth unknown
English male non-fiction writers
Writers from Norwich